The Other Story may refer to:
The Other Story (film)
The Other Story (exhibition)